Millennium Bank was a Greek bank. It was headquartered in Kallithea, Athens metropolitan area. It was founded in 2000 as Nova Bank, but on 10 November 2006 was renamed to Millennium Bank, in order to conform with the worldwide "Millennium" brand of its then parent company Millennium BCP (Banco Comercial Português) of Portugal.

In June 2013, Millennium Bank was bought by Piraeus Bank. Its operations were merged into Piraeus Bank's in December 2013.

See also

List of banks in Greece

References

Banks established in 2000
Banks disestablished in 2013
2013 disestablishments in Greece
Companies based in Attica
Kallithea
Defunct banks of Greece
Greek companies established in 2000